Daniel McAuliffe (1933 – 9 March 1999) was an Irish Gaelic footballer. He played at club level with Duagh, Feale Rangers and Shannon Rangers and at inter-county level with the Kerry senior football team.

Career

Born in Duagh, County Kerry, McAuliffe first came to prominence as a member of the local club. He made his first appearances at inter-county level as a member of the Kerry minor team that won the Munster Minor Championship title in 1951. A spell with the Kerry junior team yielded an All-Ireland Junior Championship medal in 1954, before McAuliffe was drafted onto the Kerry senior team the following year. He won his first All-Ireland Championship title as a non-playing substitute in his debut season, before claiming two further winners' medals on the field of play in 1959 and 1962. McAuliffe also won six Munster Championship titles and was involved in two National League title-winning teams. Following the conclusion of his inter-county career, he enjoyed success at club level by winning a County Championship title as captain of Shannon Rangers in 1964.

Personal life and death

McAuliffe spent his working life as a publican and owner of a scaffolding business in his native Duagh. He died aged 65 at the Bon Secours Hospital in Tralee on 9 March 1999, after battling illness for the previous seven years.

Career statistics

Honours

Shannon Rangers
Kerry Senior Football Championship: 1964 (c)

Kerry
All-Ireland Senior Football Championship: 1955, 1959, 1962
Munster Senior Football Championship: 1955, 1958, 1959, 1960, 1961, 1962, 1964
National Football League: 1958–59, 1960–61
All-Ireland Junior Football Championship: 1954
Munster Junior Football Championship: 1954
Munster Minor Football Championship: 1951

References

1933 births
1999 deaths
Duagh Gaelic footballers
Shannon Rangers Gaelic footballers
Kerry inter-county Gaelic footballers
Munster inter-provincial Gaelic footballers
Drinking establishment owners